James Obst (born August 3, 1990) is a poker player from Adelaide, Australia and World Series of Poker bracelet winner. He attended St Peter's College in Adelaide.

Career 
Obst was an accomplished junior chess player, representing Australia three times at the World Junior Chess Championship. He began playing poker at the age of 14. He started with No Limit Holdem in 2cents/ 4cents and then tried Stud Hi Lo.

Under the name "Andy McLEOD", Obst has won four Spring Championship of Online Poker titles, a World Championship of Online Poker title, and one Full Tilt Online Poker Series tournament. By the age of 19, he had already won more than $1.5 Million online.

Obst's first recorded live tournament cash came in 2009. At the WSOP, he has cashed 30 times and made seven final tables. After twice finishing runner-up, Obst won his first bracelet in 2017 in the $10,000 Razz Championship, earning $265,000. His largest cash came from a 13th-place finish at the WSOP Main Event in 2016 for $427,000.

As of 2017 Obst's live tournament winnings exceed $2,511,000. His 21 WSOP cashes account for $1,561,000 of those winnings.

James Obst did some coaching for online website RunItOnce.

World Series of Poker bracelets

Personal life 
In his free time, James Obst still plays chess, and enjoys Tennis and Golf.

External links
Hendon Mob profile
WSOP.com profile

References

Australian poker players
World Series of Poker bracelet winners
1990 births
Living people